"Electricity" is a song composed by English musician Elton John and Lee Hall for Billy Elliot the Musical. Released on 11 July 2005, it became John's 63rd UK top-40 hit, peaking at number four on the UK Singles Chart, and is his most recent solo top-40 hit in the UK. The song was included as a bonus track on the UK re-issue of Elton's album Peachtree Road.

Background

The song is sung by Billy Elliot in the stage production at his audition for a place at The Royal Ballet School in London. Billy is asked "What does it feel like, when you are dancing?" by one of the panel. Billy responds, hesitantly at first, "I can't really explain it... I haven't got the words..." And then (see full lyrics) the music takes hold, and he goes into an energetic song, describing dancing as "Something that you can't control". After two verses, each with a chorus, Billy leaps into a frenetic dance; in this dance, many skills such as acrobatics are used (the rhythm for this section of the instrumental varies from Billy to Billy, depending on each actor's dance strengths). The number concludes with another verse and Billy doing several pirouettes or tumbles.

The most notable lyric in this piece is that of the title: 'Electricity sparks inside of me and I'm free, I'm free!" It was inspired by the scene in the film, which it follows closely, in which Billy describes dancing as "Electricity". His passion, shown in his description, is the implied reason for Billy's acceptance into The Royal Ballet School.

Track listings

UK CD single
 "Electricity" – 3:30
 "Indian Sunset" (edit) – 6:25

UK enhanced maxi-single
 "Electricity" – 3:30
 "Electricity" (orchestral version) – 3:52
 "Your Song" (live '04) – 4:26
 "Your Song" (live '04 video)

European 7-inch single, blue vinyl
 "Electricity" – 3:30
 "Bite Your Lip (Get Up and Dance!)" (live '04) – 4:57
 Includes lyric sheet and poster

Charts

References

2005 singles
2005 songs
Elton John songs
Mercury Records singles
The Rocket Record Company singles
Songs from musicals
Songs with lyrics by Lee Hall (playwright)
Songs with music by Elton John